Henning Havnerås Bergsvåg (born 29 May 1974 in Bergen) is a Norwegian poet and librarian in the health service.

His bibliography includes the titles Newfoundland (2000), Nattarbeid (2003), Nemesis (2007), Over elven Tweed (2010) and Den engelske hagen (2013), all on the publishing house Gyldendal.

References

1974 births
Living people
Writers from Bergen
21st-century Norwegian poets
Norwegian male poets
Norwegian librarians
21st-century Norwegian male writers